The Bangladesh Tourism Board is the national tourism organisation of Bangladesh, responsible for promoting tourism and providing necessary training and is located in Dhaka, Bangladesh. Ahmed Jaber is the present CEO of the board.

History
The board is a statutory body established in 2010. It is located on west Agargaon, Sher e Bangla Administrative area. It is responsible for the promotion of tourism in Bangladesh. It is under the Ministry of Civil Aviation and Tourism of Bangladesh.

References

Government agencies of Bangladesh
2010 establishments in Bangladesh
Organisations based in Dhaka
Tourism agencies
Tourism in Bangladesh